JS Hirado (MSO-305) is the second ship of the Awaji-class minesweepers of the Japan Maritime Self-Defense Force (JMSDF).

Construction and career 
Awaji was laid down on 10 April 2015 and launched on 10 February 2017 by Japan Marine United Yokohama Shipyard. She was commissioned on 16 March 2018 and was incorporated It was incorporated into the 1st Mine Warfare Group and deployed to Yokosuka.

From July 18 to July 30, 2018, she conducted a mine warfare training and a Japan-US-India joint minesweeping special training in Mutsu Bay.

Gallery

Citations 

Ships built by Japan Marine United
2017 ships
Awaji-class minesweepers